Dugger Mountain Wilderness is Alabama's third and newest wilderness area.

Geography

The wilderness encompasses some of the most rugged and mountainous terrain in Alabama, as well as numerous endangered and threatened plant communities. It is one of the last intact roadless areas in Alabama's National Forests. Most of the mountain's  were too steep to profitably timber harvest.

Features
The Pinhoti National Recreation Trail winds through the wilderness area.

References

Protected areas of Calhoun County, Alabama
Protected areas of Cleburne County, Alabama
IUCN Category Ib
Wilderness areas of Alabama